When My Baby Smiles at Me is a 1948 musical film directed by Walter Lang and starring Betty Grable and Dan Dailey. Released by 20th Century Fox, it is the third film based on the popular 1927 Broadway play Burlesque, the others being The Dance of Life (1929) and Swing High, Swing Low (1937). When My Baby Smiles at Me is the first (and to date, the only) full Technicolor film version of that play; The Dance of Life had several Technicolor sequences, but they are no longer extant.

Dan Dailey received an Academy Award nomination for Best Actor for his performance, but lost to Laurence Olivier for Hamlet.

Plot
Bonny Kane and "Skid" Johnson are vaudeville performers in the 1920s. The two of them suffer marital difficulties when Skid gets an offer to appear on Broadway, while Bonny gets left behind on the road. Things get worse with Skid's increasing drinking problem, and the fact that the press has reported him to be spending a lot of time with his pretty co-star.

Cast
Betty Grable as Bonny Kane
Dan Dailey as "Skid" Johnson
Jack Oakie as Bozo Evans
June Havoc as Gussie Evans
Richard Arlen as Harvey Howell
James Gleason as Lefty Moore

Background

When My Baby Smiles at Me was 20th Century Fox's highest grossing film of 1948. Grable had been reigning the box office since the beginning of the 1940s, and scored her biggest triumph with Mother Wore Tights the previous year.
Dailey received an Academy Award nomination for his performance in this film, while Grable did not. In fact many thought she should have at least received an Oscar nomination for Mother Wore Tights.

Adaptations 
When My Baby Smiles at Me was presented on Screen Directors Playhouse May 5, 1950, with Grable reprising her role from the motion picture.

The film was parodied as "When My Baby Laughs at Me", on The Carol Burnett Show (1975 - Episode 8.18), with Carol Burnett as "Bunny" (Bonnie), Rock Hudson as "Skip" (Skid), and Vicki Lawrence as "Gussie".

It was also referenced in commercials for Peter Paul's No Jelly candy bar (1972).

References

External links
 
 
 

1948 films
1948 musical films
20th Century Fox films
Films directed by Walter Lang
Films scored by Alfred Newman
Films with screenplays by Lamar Trotti
American musical films
1940s English-language films
1940s American films